Margaret Beames (18 October 1935 – 9 February 2016) was a multi-award-winning author of children's books who lived in Feilding, New Zealand. Her first book was The Greenstone Summer, published in 1977. She had 42 books published, including one posthumously.

Awards
Beames' 2000 book Oliver in the Garden won the Picture Book category and the Children's Choice Award at the 2001 New Zealand Post Book Awards for Children and Young Adults, and was included in the 2000 Storylines Notable Books List (Picture Books category), and the White Ravens list, organised by the International Youth Library. Four other books of hers were included on the Storylines Notable Books List: Storm on the 2000 Junior Fiction list; Outlanders on the 2001 Senior Fiction list; Duster on the 2003 Junior Fiction list; and Spirit of the Deep on the 2007 Young Adult Fiction list. Two of her books were finalists in the Junior Fiction category of the New Zealand Post Children's Book Awards, Archway Arrow in 1997, and The Shearwater Bell in 1998. She was the University of Otago College of Education Writer in Residence in 2005.

Personal life
Beames was born in Oxford, England, and lived in Kenya for two years. In 1974, she moved to New Zealand and worked as a teacher for more than 30 years. She was married with two children and six grandchildren. She died on 9 February 2016.

References

External links

Profile at the Read NZ Te Pou Muramura website
Margaret Beames profile at the Storylines Children's Literature Charitable Trust of New Zealand website

1935 births
2016 deaths
New Zealand children's writers
New Zealand women novelists
New Zealand women children's writers
20th-century New Zealand women writers
21st-century New Zealand women writers
20th-century New Zealand novelists
21st-century New Zealand novelists
Writers from Oxford
English emigrants to New Zealand